The 2022 season was Johor Darul Ta'zim Football Club's 49th season in club history and 8th season in the Malaysia Super League after rebranding their name from Johor FC.

Squad

First-team squad

Johor Darul Ta'zim II F.C.

Transfers and contracts

In

Pre-season

Note 1: Endrick will stay with Penang and return in 2023.

Note 2: Carli de Murga was allocated to JDT 2 for the 2022 season.

Note 3: Bienvenido Marañón was released in July 2022.

Mid-season

Note 1: Kobe JC will be loaned to Pahang FC till the end of season for exchange for the transfer of Azam Aziz.

Loan in / return

Pre-season

Note 1: S.Kumaahran returned from loan before moving to Petaling Jaya City.

Note 2: Che Rashid returned from loan and moved to Negeri Sembilan FC on loan for the 2022 season.

Note 3: Fazly Mazlan returned from loan and moved to Selangor for the 2022 season.

Note 4: Gary Steven Robbat returned to Melaka United on loan for another season.

Note 5: Jonathan Herrera returned to the club after Independiente refused to pick up the transfer option. He moved to Club Atlético Patronato on loan for 2022 season.

Note 6: Hasbullah Abu Bakar returned from loan before returning to  Melaka United .

Note 7: Gary Steven Robbat moved to Sabah FC for the new season on permanent basis after his loan in 2021 ended.

Mid-season

Out

Pre-season

Mid-season

Loan out

Pre-season

Mid-season

Retained

Rumors

Friendly matches

Tour of UAE

Pre-season Friendly

Mid-season Friendly

In-season Friendly

Competitions

Overview

Charity Shield

Malaysia Super League

Table

Malaysia Super League fixtures and results

Update: 16 August 2022

Malaysia FA Cup

Malaysia Cup

Bracket

Round of 16

Johor Darul Ta'zim won 6–0 on aggregate.

Quarter-final

Johor Darul Ta'zim won 8–0 on aggregate.

Semi-final

Johor Darul Ta'zim won 4–1 on aggregate.

Final

AFC Champions League

Group stage

Knockout stage
Round of 16

Club statistics
Correct as of match played on 15 May 2022

Appearances
@  20 Nov 2022

Johor Darul Ta'zim II

Malaysia Premier League

Squad staticstics

|-
! colspan="16" style="background:#dcdcdc; text-align:center"| Goalkeepers

|-
! colspan="16" style="background:#dcdcdc; text-align:center"| Defenders

|-
! colspan="16" style="background:#dcdcdc; text-align:center"| Midfielders

|-
! colspan="16" style="background:#dcdcdc; text-align:center"| Forwards

|-
! colspan="16" style="background:#dcdcdc; text-align:center"| Players loaned out during the season
|}

References

Johor Darul Ta'zim F.C.
2022 in Malaysian football
Johor Darul Ta'zim